The naval Battle of the Gulf of Naples took place on 5 June 1284 in the south of the Gulf of Naples, Italy, when an Aragonese-Sicilian galley fleet commanded by Roger of Lauria defeated a Neapolitan galley fleet commanded by Charles of Salerno (later Charles II of Naples) and captured Charles.

Charles' Genoese allies had collected several large fleets of galleys, and Lauria determined to attack Charles' galleys which were at Naples before these could join them and hunt down Lauria. He used the cover of darkness to arrive off Naples, where he made several raids ashore to try to tempt Charles out where he could be fought. On the night before the battle, Lauria captured two Provençal galleys sent ahead by Charles' ally and father Charles I of Naples who was heading south from Genoa. Charles had definite orders to stay in port and wait for his allies, but his impetuousness overcame his initial reluctance and after Lauria's galleys approached closely the Neapolitans came out in single file and chased them in a disorganised manner southward. Lauria feigned retreat and kept ahead of them until he drew close to ten or so galleys he had left near Castellammare, then turned and formed a crescent formation, with the galleys that had joined at the rear, and attacked Charles' fleet from the sides, where galleys were the most vulnerable. Charles' fifteen to eighteen Regno galleys fled back to Naples, leaving the nine to thirteen French-crewed galleys to be captured. Charles' galley was the last to be captured, and surrendered only when Lauria sent divers overboard in order to sink it. Charles was kept prisoner until Edward I of England intervened in 1288.

Ships involved
Aragon-Sicily (Roger of Lauria)
about 29 galleys
some transports
some small vessels

Neapolitans (Charles of Salerno)
15–18 galleys of the Kingdom of Naples
9–13 French-crewed galleys
(about 28 galleys total, possibly more)

References

Gulf of Naples
1284 in Europe
13th century in the Kingdom of Naples
13th century in the Kingdom of Sicily
Conflicts in 1284
Charles I of Anjou